Acmopolynema is a genus of fairyflies within the family Mymaridae.

Species 

 Acmopolynema aberrans 
 Acmopolynema bifasciatipenne 
 Acmopolynema bimaculatum 
 Acmopolynema brasiliense 
 Acmopolynema callopterum 
 Acmopolynema campylura 
 Acmopolynema carinatum 
 Acmopolynema commune 
 Acmopolynema delphacivorum 
 Acmopolynema gracilicorne 
 Acmopolynema helavai 
 Acmopolynema hervali 
 Acmopolynema himalum 
 Acmopolynema immaculatum 
 Acmopolynema inaequale 
 Acmopolynema incognitum 
 Acmopolynema indochinense 
 Acmopolynema infuscatum 
 Acmopolynema kronidiphagum 
 Acmopolynema longicorne 
 Acmopolynema longicoxilla 
 Acmopolynema maculatum 
 Acmopolynema malabaricum 
 Acmopolynema miamiense 
 Acmopolynema michailovskayae 
 Acmopolynema mirabile 
 Acmopolynema missionicum 
 Acmopolynema monicae 
 Acmopolynema nixoni 
 Acmopolynema obscuricorne 
 Acmopolynema orchidea 
 Acmopolynema orientale 
 Acmopolynema pacificum 
 Acmopolynema pecki 
 Acmopolynema perterebrator 
 Acmopolynema plaumanni 
 Acmopolynema poecilopterum 
 Acmopolynema polyrhiza 
 Acmopolynema pseudotachikawai 
 Acmopolynema pteron 
 Acmopolynema reticoxilla 
 Acmopolynema rufescens 
 Acmopolynema scapulare 
 Acmopolynema sema 
 Acmopolynema tachikawai 
 Acmopolynema uma 
 Acmopolynema unimaculatum 
 Acmopolynema ussuricum 
 Acmopolynema varium 
 Acmopolynema vittatipenne

References 

Mymaridae